The Colonel's Son is an American silent film produced by Kalem Company and directed by Sidney Olcott with Gene Gauntier and Jack J. Clark in the leading roles. The action takes place during the American Civil War.

Cast
 Gene Gauntier
 Jack J. Clark

Production notes
 The film was shot in Jacksonville, Florida.

External links

 The Colonel's Son website dedicated to Sidney Olcott

1911 films
Silent American drama films
American silent short films
American Civil War
Films set in Florida
Films shot in Jacksonville, Florida
Films directed by Sidney Olcott
1911 short films
1911 drama films
American black-and-white films
1910s American films